Solariella periscopia is a species of sea snail, a marine gastropod mollusk in the family Solariellidae. It is commonly referred to as the "look-around solarelle", and was first described in 1927.

Distribution
This species occurs in the Western Atlantic Ocean (North Carolina, the Bahamas), the Caribbean Sea and the Gulf of Mexico.

Description 
The maximum recorded shell length is 3 mm.

Habitat 
Minimum recorded depth is 46 m. Maximum recorded depth is 95 m.

References

 Dall, W. H. 1927. Diagnoses of undescribed new species of mollusks in the collection of the United States National Museum. Proceedings of the United States National Museum 70(2668): 1–11
 Dall W. H. (1927). Small shells from dredgings off the southeast coast of the United states by the United States Fisheries Steamer "Albatross", in 1885 and 1886. Proceedings of the United States National Museum, 70(18): 1–134

External links

periscopia
Gastropods described in 1927